The Baron Knoop, ex-Bevan Stradivarius is a violin made by the celebrated luthier Antonio Stradivari in Cremona, Italy in 1715.

The instrument is named for Baron Johann Knoop (1846–1918), a collector of dozens of great violins, violas, and cellos at one time or another including four violas representing more than a third of extant Stradivari violas. Upon the sale of the instrument to J.E. Greiner through the agency of Wurlitzer in New York, the W. E. Hill firm in London, proposed that the violin be named for their customer, Baron Knoop. Several instruments by the great master luthiers bear the sobriquet Baron Knoop, including another Stradivari of 1715, the Alard-Knoop. In their 1902 publication of Antonio Stradivari His Life and Work, while in the possession of London banker F.L. Bevan, the violin was referenced by the name Knoop, commenting that the violin is of "the first rank."

In the letter provided to Greiner at the time of his purchase of the Baron Knoop, the Hills commented that it was the violin upon which Knoop most enjoyed playing. The instrument is currently owned by collector David L. Fulton.

Provenance
Mr. Oechsner, c. 1870; C.G. Meier 1881; F.L. Bevan c. 1882; Richard Bennett 1913; J.E. Greiner, 1928; J. Frank Otwell, 1944; Raymond Cerf, 1954; Rony Rogoff, 1980; David L. Fulton, 1992.

See also
 Stradivarius

References

External links
 

1715 musical instruments
Stradivari violins
1715 works
Stradivari instruments